Churuk-e Sofla (also Romanized as Chūrūk-e Soflá; also known as Chūrūk-e Pā’īn and Chūzak-e Soflá) is a village in Zanjanrud-e Pain Rural District, Zanjanrud District, Zanjan County, Zanjan Province, Iran. At the 2006 census, its population was 274, in 55 families.

References 

Populated places in Zanjan County